is a professional Japanese football player who currently plays for SC Kapellen-Erft as a midfielder.

References

External links
Profile at Albirex Niigata (S) official website

1989 births
Living people
Japanese footballers
People from Okazaki, Aichi
Albirex Niigata Singapore FC players
Association football midfielders
Japanese expatriate footballers
Expatriate footballers in Singapore